is the J-pop duo Rythem's ninth single. It was released on March 1, 2006 under Sony Music Entertainment Japan label. The title track was used as the sixth ending theme for the anime Yakitate!! Japan making this their second and last tie-in with the said anime series. This single peaked the #53 spot in the Oricon weekly charts.

The item's stock number is AICL-1732.

Track listing
Kokoro Biidama
Composition/Lyrics: Rythem
Arrangement: CHOKKAKU
M
Composition: Kaori Kishitani
Lyrics: Kyoko Tomita
Original singer: Princess Princess
Negai (Asayake ver.)
Kokoro Biidama (instrumental)

2006 singles
Rythem songs
2006 songs